"I Am Pegasus" is a pop rock song written and recorded by American-Australian singer-songwriter Ross Ryan, which was issued as a single in September 1973 ahead of his third album, My Name Means Horse (February 1974). It was produced by Peter Dawkins for EMI Music Australia, which peaked at No. 2 on the Australian charts.

Ryan told APRAPs Debbie Kruger in March 2002 how he had merged two songs, "One was about the fact that I had just discovered that Ross means horse... also at the time I was having a really disastrous attempt at a relationship with an air hostess... [I was] getting nowhere with them, so I combined them and got a flying horse. And I came up with Pegasus... I looked up all the things that rhymed with Pegasus and I got Dimitrius and Sagittarius." The writing process took the artist about two months and after Dawkins heard it, the producer felt, "it was the obvious single."

Track listing

All track were written by Ross Ryan.
 I Am Pegasus - 3:25
 Country Christine Waltz - 4:14

Charts

Weekly charts

Year-end charts

References

1973 songs
1973 singles
EMI Records singles
Song recordings produced by Peter Dawkins (musician)